Yanshan is a county in Shangrao Municipality, in north-eastern Jiangxi province.

Situation
It borders Hengfeng County to the north, Shangrao County to the east, Wannian County and Guixi City (in Yingtan) to the west and Wuyishan City and Guangze County (both in Nanping, FJ) to the south.

Waterways
Hekou town sits on the Xinjiang River, a tributary to Boyang Lake in the lower Yangzi River watershed.

Administration
The county seat, by Chinese convention often also called Yanshan, is at Hekou town.

7 Towns (镇, zhen)

8 Townships (乡, xiang)

2 Ethnic Townships (族乡, zu xiang)
 She Taiyuan
 She Huangbi

Climate

Notes and references

Shangrao
County-level divisions of Jiangxi